Zapatoca is a town and municipality in the Santander Department in northeastern Colombia. It is at a high altitude and is a common stop between Bucaramanga and San Gil. It was built in the early 17th century by the Spanish conquistadores.

Notable people 
 Miguel Acuña (1788-1847), Franciscan priest and medical practitioner
 José de Jesús Pimiento Rodríguez (1919 - 2019 in Floridablanca) was a Prelate of the Catholic Church. Until his death the age of 100 he was the oldest living cardinal.
 Carlos Toledo Plata (1932 - 1984 in Bucaramanga) was a doctor, politician and co-founder and early leader of the guerrilla movement known as M-19.

References 

Municipalities of Santander Department